Heroes of Battle is a hardcover supplement to the 3.5 edition of the Dungeons and Dragons role-playing game.

Contents
Heroes of Battle is intended for use by Dungeon Masters who want to incorporate large-scale, epic battles into their game. It contains ideas for wartime adventures, new rules for wartime games, and military-oriented feats, prestige classes and non-player characters.

Publication history
Heroes of Battle was written by David Noonan, Will McDermott and Stephen Schubert, and published May 2005 by Wizards of the Coast. Cover art is by David Hudnut, with interior art by Wayne England, Doug Kovacs, Chuck Lukacs, Roberto Marchesi, Mark Nelson, Eric Polak, Wayne Reynolds, and Franz Vohwinkel.

David Noonan was the in-house designer for the project, so he outlined the vision for the book before he, Will McDermott, and Steve Schubert started writing. Andy Collins joined the process as the design phase was winding down, and led the project development phase during the six weeks after its completion.

Reception
The reviewer from Pyramid commented that "Heroes of Battle not only provides both the mechanics and the RPG feel the story demands, but weaves them together into a beautiful tapestry."

References

Dungeons & Dragons sourcebooks
Role-playing game supplements introduced in 2005